Mark Russell (born 12 November 1933) is a Scottish-American film and television actor. He is perhaps best known for playing Detective Percy Saperstein in the American crime drama television series Kojak.

Born in Glasgow, Scotland, in which Russell was then raised in Brooklyn, New York, later moving to California. He began his career in 1959, where he first appeared in the western television series Bonanza. Russell guest-starred in numerous television programs including The Fugitive, 12 O'Clock High, The Time Tunnel, Batman, Hogan's Heroes, Adam-12, Mission: Impossible, Land of the Giants, Ironside, Star Trek: The Original Series, Dragnet 1967, Emergency!, Quincy, M.E., The Odd Couple and Mannix.

Russell was originally a stand-in for actor Telly Savalas, who played the main role of Lieutenant Theo Kojak. His character, Detective Percy Saperstein, was then created, in which he won the role. He also appeared on films such as The Errand Boy, Hangup, Captain Newman, M.D., Viva Las Vegas, Not with My Wife, You Don't, The Comic, Girl Happy, How to Succeed in Business Without Really Trying, Youngblood Hawke, The Notorious Landlady, Blume in Love, How to Murder Your Wife, Get to Know Your Rabbit, Warning Shot and Moving Violation.

Detective Saperstein's first name was not Percy it is Mark. There are only two times throughout the series where he is referred to as Mark. The first being in episode 7 of season 1 when Crocker explains to Kojak that during surveillance that he was doing with Saperstein that neithe Mark or I saw the suspect drop a package.

References

External links 

Rotten Tomatoes profile

1933 births
Living people
Male actors from Glasgow
Scottish male film actors
Scottish male television actors
20th-century Scottish male actors
Scottish emigrants to the United States
American male film actors
American male television actors
20th-century American male actors